Sandhill View Academy is a coeducational secondary school in Sunderland, Tyne and Wear, England.

Status and achievements
In 2007 the school received its specialised status in Performing Arts, under the Performing Arts leadership of Mr. James Andriot who left the school in 2009.

Sandhill View moved into a new modern building on the site of the former building in 2002, under the headship of Mrs. Phil Marshall, who left the school in 2004 to join Monkwearmouth School. The school is now run by the Southmoor Multi Academy Trust with Headteacher Mrs J. Maw following the retirement of Mr. Richard Bain in 2014.

The school takes pupils from its feeder schools: Thorney Close Primary School, Grindon Broadway Junior School, Hastings Hill Primary School and Plains Farm Primary School.

The school changed its name to Sandhill View Community Arts School in May 2011. In July 2015 the school converted to academy status and was renamed Sandhill View Academy. The school is now part of the Southmoor Multi-Academy Trust.

External links
Sandhill View School website

Secondary schools in the City of Sunderland
Academies in the City of Sunderland
Sunderland